Andmoresound was an independent record label based in Glasgow, Scotland, managed and operated by musician and businessman, Lindsay Boyd. It was named in homage to the song "Andmoreagain" by the band Love.

Andmoresound was responsible for launching several Scottish indie pop and indie rock bands, including Tacoma Radar and Boyd's own group Mac Meda. The label's most notable signing was another band in which Boyd occasionally played, indie pop group Camera Obscura, a band who would find greater success on the Elefant Records and Merge Records labels. Mac Meda's debut single, "My Favourite Trashcan" claimed NME 's 'Single of the Week' title on its release.

List of notable releases
1998:   Mac Meda – "My Favourite Trashcan" 7" single AND0145
1998: 	 Camera Obscura – "Park and Ride" 7" single AND0945
1998: 	 Camera Obscura – "Your Sound" CD single AND11CDS
2001: 	 Camera Obscura – "Eighties Fan" CD single AND16CDS
2001: 	 Camera Obscura – Biggest Bluest Hi Fi Album AND17LP
2004: 	 Tacoma Radar – "And No One Waved Goodbye" Album AND1833

References

Defunct record labels of the United Kingdom